Holmsten is a surname. Notable people with the surname include:

Karl-Arne Holmsten (1911–1995), Swedish film actor
Sara Holmsten (1715–1795), Swedish memoirist
Sevi Holmsten (1921–1993), Finnish rower

Surnames of Scandinavian origin